Henry Mathison Pelling (27 August 1920 – 14 October 1997) was a British historian best known for his works on the history of the British Labour Party.

Life
Pelling was born in Prenton, Wirral, the son of a wealthy stockbroker. He was educated at Birkenhead School and St John's College, Cambridge, where he gained firsts in Part I of the Classical tripos and Part II of the Historical tripos prior to completing a PhD in 1950. He began his career as a fellow at Queen's College, Oxford, where he remained until his return to St John's in 1966. He was Reader in British History at Cambridge from 1976 to 1980, at which point he decided to retire from university teaching. Doing so, however, led St John's to terminate his college fellowship as well, much to his chagrin, and it was only after a great deal of protest that he was reinstated (an interregnum he referred to thereafter as socius ejectus, in imitation of Thomas Baker). He was elected a Fellow of the British Academy (FBA) in 1992. Pelling's collection of British left-wing political pamphlets is held at Senate House Library, while his papers are lodged with St John's College.

Publications
Pelling's main contributions to the study of the Labour Party were as follows:
The Origins of the Labour Party (1954) and 
A Short History of the Labour Party (1961) (later editions co-written with Alastair J. Reid)

He was also a pioneer of the serious study of twentieth-century electoral and party politics, and wrote such other works as:

Modern Britain 1885-1955
Social Geography of British Elections: 1885-1910 
Winston Churchill 
Britain and the Marshall Plan 
American Labor
A History of British Trade Unionism, London, 1963
America and the British left: from Bright to Bevan
The British Communist Party: a historical profile
The 1945 General Election Reconsidered
Popular Politics and Society in Late Victorian Britain
Britain and the Second World War
The Labour Governments 1945-51

References

External links
 Pelling's collection at Senate House Library
Pelling's papers at St John's College
Copac listing of his work

1920 births
1997 deaths
Alumni of St John's College, Cambridge
People educated at Birkenhead School
20th-century British historians
Fellows of St John's College, Cambridge